The economy of El Salvador has experienced relatively low rates of GDP growth, in comparison to other developing countries. Rates have not risen above the low single digits in nearly two decades – part of a broader environment of macroeconomic instability which the integration of the United States dollar has done little to improve. One problem that the Salvadoran economy faces is the inequality in the distribution of income. In 2011, El Salvador had a Gini Coefficient of .485, which although similar to that of the United States, leaves 37.8% of the population below the poverty line, due to lower aggregate income. The richest 10% of the population receives approximately 15 times the income of the poorest 40%.

As of 3 November 2014, the IMF reports official reserve assets to be $3.192B. Foreign currency reserves (in convertible foreign currencies) are $2.675B. Securities are $2.577B with total currency and deposits at $94.9M. Securities with other national central banks (BIS and IMF) are $81.10M. Securities with banks headquartered outside the reporting country $13.80M. SDRs are at $245.5M. Gold reserves (including gold deposits and, if appropriate, gold swapped) reported at $271.4M with volume in millions of fine Troy ounces at $200k. Other reserve assets are financial derivatives valued at $2.7M.

Having this hard currency buffer to work with, the Salvadoran Government undertook a monetary integration plan beginning 1 January 2001, by which the U.S. dollar became legal tender alongside the colón, and all formal accounting was undertaken in U.S. dollars. This way, the government has formally limited its possibility of implementing open market monetary policies to influence short term variables in the economy. Since 2004, the colón stopped circulating and is now never used in the country for any type of transaction; however some stores still have prices in both colons and U.S. dollars. In general, people were unhappy with the shift from the colón to the U.S. dollar, because wages are still the same but the price of everything increased. Some economists claim this rise in prices would have been caused by inflation regardless, even had the shift not been made. Some economists also contend that now, according to Gresham's Law, a reversion to the colón would be disastrous to the economy. The change to the dollar also precipitated a trend toward lower interest rates in El Salvador, helping many to secure credit in order to buy a house or a car. Over time, displeasure with the change has largely disappeared, though the issue resurfaces as a political tool when elections are on the horizon.

In June 2021, President Nayib Bukele said he would introduce legislation to make Bitcoin legal tender in El Salvador. The Bitcoin Law was passed by the Legislative Assembly on 9 June 2021, with a majority vote of 62 out of 84. Bitcoin officially became legal tender ninety days after the publication of the law in the official gazette. As part of the law, foreigners can gain permanent residence in El Salvador if they invest 3 Bitcoin into the country. In January 2022, The International Monetary Fund (IMF) urged El Salvador to reverse its decision to make cryptocurrency Bitcoin legal tender. Bitcoin had rapidly lost about half of its value, meaning economic difficulties for El Salvador. President Bukele had announced his plans to build a Bitcoin city at the base of a volcano in El Salvador.

In 2021, El Salvador received a $40 million loan for small enterprises and projects for climate action, from the European Investment Bank to the country's development bank, Banco de Desarollo de el Salvador. $20 million will be used to assist investments in renewable energy projects, specifically photovoltaics, biogas, and micro hydro projects. Up to 50% of the loan line will be used to assist small and medium-sized enterprises who were affected by the COVID-19 pandemic.

Public sector 

Fiscal policy has been one of the biggest challenges for the Salvadoran government. The 1992 peace accords committed the government to heavy expenditures for transition programs and social services. The stability adjustment programs (PAE, for the initials in Spanish) initiated by President Cristiani's administration committed the government to the privatization of banks, the pension system, electric and telephone companies. The total privatization of the pension system has implied a serious burden for the public finances, because the newly created private Pension Association Funds did not absorb coverage of retired pensioners covered in the old system. As a result, in July 2017, the Government of El Salvador wanted to take $500 million from the privatized pension system to cover retired pensioners from the old not privatized system, but the Supreme Court of El Salvador declared this move unconstitutional.

The government lost the revenues from contributors and absorbed completely the costs of coverage of retired pensioners. This has been the main source of fiscal imbalance. ARENA governments have financed this deficit with the emission of bonds, something the leftist party FMLN has opposed. Debates surrounding the emission of bonds have stalled the approval of the national budget for many months on several occasions, reason for which in 2006 the government will finance the deficit by reducing expenditure in other posts. The emission of bonds and the approval of a loans need a qualified majority (3/4 of the votes) in the parliament. If the deficit is not financed through a loan it is enough with a simple majority to approve the budget (50% of the votes plus 1). This would facilitate an otherwise long process in Salvadoran politics.

Despite such challenges to keep public finances in balance, El Salvador still has one of the lowest tax burdens in the American continent (around 11% of GDP). The government has focused on improving the collection of its current revenues with a focus on indirect taxes. Leftist politicians criticize such a structure since indirect taxes (like the value added tax) affect everyone alike, whereas direct taxes can be weighed according to levels of income and are therefore more punitive toward productive people. However, some basic goods are exempt from the indirect taxes. A value-added tax (VAT) of 10%, implemented in September 1992, was raised to 13% in July 1995. The VAT is the biggest source of revenue for the government, accounting for about 52.3% of total tax revenues in 2004.

Economic sectors

Remittances 

Remittances from Salvadorans working in the United States sent to family members are a major source of foreign income and offset the substantial trade deficit of around $2.9 billion. Remittances have increased steadily in the last decade and reached an all-time high of $2.9 billion in 2005—approximately 17.1% of gross national product (GNP).

In recent years inflation has fallen to single digit levels, and total exports have grown substantially.

Agriculture 

In 2018, El Salvador produced 7 million tons of sugarcane, being heavily dependent on this product. In addition to sugarcane, the country produced 685 thousand tons of maize, 119 thousand tons of coconut, 109 thousand tons of sorghum, 93 thousand tons of beans, 80 thousand tons of coffee, 64 thousand tons of orange, in addition to smaller yields of other agricultural products such as watermelon, yautia, apple, manioc, mango, banana, rice etc.

The ultimate goal was to develop a rural middle class with a stake in a peaceful and prosperous future for El Salvador. At least 525,000 people—more than 12% of El Salvador's population at the time and perhaps 25% of the rural poor—benefited from agrarian reform, and more than 22% of El Salvador's total farmland was transferred to those who previously worked the land but did not own it. But when agrarian reform ended in 1990, about 150,000 landless families still had not benefited from the reform actions.

The 1992 peace accords made provisions for land transfers to all qualified ex-combatants of both the FMLN and ESAF, as well as to landless peasants living in former conflict areas. The United States undertook to provide $300 million for a national reconstruction plan. This included $60 million for land purchases and $17 million for agricultural credits. USAID remains actively involved in providing technical training, access to credit, and other financial services for many of the land beneficiaries.

Energy

El Salvador's energy industry is diversified across fossil fuels, hydro, other renewables (mainly geothermal) for local electricity production, along with a reliance on imports for oil. El Salvador has an installed capacity of 1,983 MW generating 5,830 GWh of electricity per year, 52% of this comes from renewable sources including 29% from geothermal (produced from the country's many volcanoes), 23% from hydro and the rest is from fossil fuels.

According to the National Energy Commission, 94.4% of total injections during January 2021 came from hydroelectric plants (28.5% - 124.43 GWh), geothermal (27.3% - 119.07 GWh), biomass (24.4% 106.43 GWh), photovoltaic solar (10.6% - 46.44 GWh) and wind (3.6% - 15.67 GWh).

Manufacturing
El Salvador historically has been the most industrialized state in Central America, though a decade of war eroded this position. In 1999, manufacturing accounted for 22% of GDP. The industrial sector has shifted since 1993 from a primarily domestic orientation to include free zone (maquiladora) manufacturing for export. Maquila exports have led the growth in the export sector and in the last 3 years have made an important contribution to the Salvadoran economy.

Telecommunications

El Salvador has 0.9 million fixed telephone lines, 0.5 million fixed broadband lines and 9.4 million mobile cellular subscriptions. Much of the population is able to access the internet through their smartphones and mobile networks, which liberal government regulation promotes mobile penetration over fixed line including the deployment of 5G coverage (which testing of began in 2020). Transition to digital transmission of TV/radio networks was done in 2018 with the adaptation of the ISDB-T standard. There are hundreds of privately owned national TV networks, cable TV networks (that also carry international channels), and radio stations available; while there is also 1 government owned broadcast station.

El Salvador's IT Industry's history started early with several IT outsourcing companies such as Gpremper and an early search engine that predated Google in 1995 called "Buscaniguas". The industry has since expanded with companies such as Creativa Consultores, Applaudo Studios, and Elaniin providing software and website design services to clients globally while employing thousands of people. Canadian Telus International, a major global IT outsourcing and software development firm, has a significant workforce in the country employing nearly 1,500 people in high tech and customer service roles. The startup scene has also been growing with firms such as HugoApp employing 600 locals and providing delivery and ride sharing services to nearly 1 million users in the Central American/CAFTA region. In 2020, the government announced its "Digital Agenda 2020" a plan to digitize government services, digitize identities, make it easier to start businesses, attract foreign investment and improve the education system. Finally, the passing of the Bitcoin Law in 2021 made El Salvador the first country in the world to adopt a cryptocurrency (Bitcoin) as legal tender, this move seeks to improve access to financial services to the non-banked and under banked while also making El Salvador a hub for innovation.

Services
In the 21st century, numerous call centers serving North American markets have been developed in El Salvador, including Ubiquity Global Services and Synnex. The industry benefits from the availability of a large English speaking work force, composed of deportees from the United States.

Trade

A challenge in El Salvador has been developing new growth sectors for a more diversified economy. As many other former colonies, for many years El Salvador was considered a mono exporter economy. This means, an economy that depended heavily on one type of export. During colonial times, the Spanish decided that El Salvador would produce and export indigo, but after the invention of synthetic dyes in the 19th century, Salvadoran authorities and the newly created modern state turned to coffee as the main export of the economy.

Since the cultivation of coffee required the highest lands in the country, many of these lands were expropriated from indigenous reserves and given or sold cheaply to those that could cultivate coffee. The government provided little or no compensation to the indigenous peoples. On occasions this compensation implied merely the right to work for seasons in the newly created coffee farms and to be allowed to grow their own food. Such policies provided the basis of conflicts that would shape the political situation of El Salvador in the years to come.

ARENA governments have followed policies that intend to develop other exporting industries in the country as textiles and sea products. Tourism is another industry Salvadoran authorities regard as a possibility for the country. But rampant crime rates, lack of infrastructure and inadequate social capital have prevented these possibilities from being properly exploited. The government is also developing ports and infrastructure in La Unión in the east of the country, in order to use the area as a "dry canal" for transporting goods from Gulf of Fonseca in the Pacific Ocean to Honduras and the Atlantic Ocean in the north. Currently there are fifteen free trade zones in El Salvador. The largest beneficiary has been the maquila industry, which provides 88,700 jobs directly, and consists primarily of cutting and assembling clothes for export to the United States.

El Salvador signed the Central American Free Trade Agreement (CAFTA), negotiated by the five countries of Central America and the Dominican Republic, with the United States in 2004. In order to take advantage of CAFTA-DR, the Salvadoran government is challenged to conduct policies that guarantee better conditions for entrepreneurs and workers to transfer from declining to growing sectors in the economy. El Salvador has already signed free trade agreements with Mexico, Chile, the Dominican Republic, and Panama, and increased its exports to those countries. El Salvador, Guatemala, Honduras, and Nicaragua also are negotiating a free trade agreement with Canada, and negotiations started on 2006 for a free trade agreement with Colombia.

El Salvador's balance of payments continued to show a net surplus. Exports in 1999 grew 1.9% while imports grew 3%, narrowing El Salvador's trade deficit. As in the previous year, the large trade deficit was offset by foreign aid and family remittances. Remittances are increasing at an annual rate of 6.5%, and an estimated $1.35 billion will enter the national economy during 1999.

Private foreign capital continued to flow in, though mostly as short-term import financing and not at the levels of previous years. The Central American Common Market continued its dynamic reactivation process, now with most regional commerce duty-free. In September 1996, El Salvador, Guatemala, and Honduras opened free trade talks with Mexico. This trade alliance is also known as the Northern Triangle in relation to the Central American economies that are grouped together by proximity and location. Although tariff cuts that were expected in July 1996 were delayed until 1997, the government of El Salvador is committed to a free and open economy.

Total U.S. exports to El Salvador reached $2.1 billion in 1999, while El Salvador exported $1.6 billion to the United States. U.S. support for El Salvador's privatization of the electrical and telecommunications markets has markedly expanded opportunities for U.S. investment in the country. More than 300 U.S. companies have established either a permanent commercial presence in El Salvador or work through representative offices in the country. The Department of State maintains a country commercial guide for U.S. businesses seeking detailed information on business opportunities in El Salvador.

Natural disasters: Hurricane Mitch (1998) and the earthquakes (2001)
Hurricane Mitch hit El Salvador in late October 1998, generating extreme rainfall of which caused widespread flooding and landslides. Roughly 650 km2 were flooded, and the Salvadoran Government pronounced 374 people dead or missing. In addition, approximately 55,900 people were rendered homeless. The areas that suffered the most were the low-lying coastal zones, particularly in the floodplain of the Lempa and San Miguel Grande Rivers. Three major bridges that cross the Lempa were swept away, restricting access to the eastern third of the country and forcing the emergency evacuation of many communities. The heavy rainfall, flooding, and mudslides caused by Hurricane Mitch also severely damaged El Salvador's road network. Along with the three major bridges over the Lempa River, 12 other bridges were damaged or destroyed by the Mitch flooding.

The largest single-affected sector was El Salvador's agriculture. Nearly 18% of the total 1998–99 basic grain harvest was lost. Coffee production was hit particularly hard; 3% of the harvest was lost in addition to 8.2% that was lost earlier in the year due to El Niño. Major losses of sugarcane, totaling 9% of the estimated 1998–99 production, were sustained primarily in the coastal regions. Livestock losses amounted to $1 million, including 2,992 head of cattle. In addition to these losses, El Salvador also had to face the threat of disease outbreak. The Ministry of Health recorded a total of 109,038 medical cases related to Hurricane Mitch between 31 October and 18 November 1998; 23% of these cases were respiratory infections, followed by skin ailments, diarrhea, and conjunctivitis.

Reconstruction from Mitch was still underway when, in early 2001, the country experienced a series of devastating earthquakes that left nearly 2,000 people dead or missing, 8,000 injured, and caused severe dislocations across all sectors of Salvadoran society. Nearly 25% of all private homes in the country were either destroyed or badly damaged, and 1.5 million persons were left without housing. Hundreds of public buildings were damaged or destroyed, and sanitation and water systems in many communities put out service. The total cost of the damage was estimated at between $1.5 billion and $2 billion, and the devastation thought to equal or surpass that of the 1986 quake that struck San Salvador. Given the magnitude of the disaster, reconstruction and economic recovery will remain the primary focus of the Salvadoran Government for some time to come.

The Hurricane Mitch disaster prompted a tremendous response from the international community governments, nongovernmental organizations (NGOs), and private citizens alike. Sixteen foreign governments—including the U.S., 19 international NGOs, 20 Salvadoran embassies and consulates, and 20 private firms and individuals provided El Salvador with in-kind assistance. The Government of El Salvador reports that 961 tons of goods and food were received. The Ministry of Foreign Affairs estimates that contribution in cash given directly to the Salvadoran Government totaled $4.3 million. The U.S. Government has provided $37.7 million in assistance through USAID and the U.S. Departments of Agriculture and Defense.

Following the 2001 earthquakes, the U.S. embassy assumed a leading role in implementing U.S.-sponsored assistance. The U.S. Government responded immediately to the emergency, with military helicopters active in initial rescue operations, delivering emergency supplies, rescue workers, and damage assessment teams to stricken communities all over the country. USAIDs Office of Foreign Disaster Assistance had a team of experts working with Salvadoran relief authorities immediately after both quakes, and provided assistance totaling more than $14 million. In addition, the Department of Defense provided an initial response valued at more than $11 million. For long-term reconstruction, the international community offered a total aid package of $1.3 billion, over $110 million of it from the United States.

Macro-economic trend
The following table shows the main economic indicators in 1980–2017.

See also

 Central Reserve Bank of El Salvador
 Coffee production in El Salvador
 List of companies of El Salvador
 Salvadoran Stock Exchange

References

External links
World Bank Summary Trade Statistics El Salvador
Tariffs applied by El Salvador as provided by ITC's Market Access Map, an online database of customs tariffs and market requirements.
Apparel and Textiles Retrieved 2008-03-30

 
El Salvador